NSC may refer to:

Sport and competition
 Nashville SC, an American soccer team
 NSC United, an American soccer team
 National Scholastics Championship, an American quiz bowl competition
 National Scrabble Championship, now known as the Scrabble Players Championship
 National Shooting Centre, historic British shooting sports complex near Bisley, United Kingdom
 National Sports Center, an American sports complex
 National Sports Centre (Isle of Man)
 National Sports Club of India
 Nejmeh SC, a Lebanese association football club
 Nepean Sailing Club
 North Star Conference, a defunct women's college sports conference

Education
 National Senior Certificate, a South African educational certificate
 Nehru Science Centre, Mumbai, India
 Nevada State College
 Northern Southland College, a secondary School in Lumsden, New Zealand
 Yoshimoto New Star Creation, a Japanese comedy school

Transport
 National Security Cutter, a U.S. Coast Guard ship design
 Network SouthCentral, a British railway company
 Norfolk Southern Railway, an American railway company
 North–South Corridor, Singapore, an expressway in Singapore
 North Spokane Corridor, a freeway in Spokane, Washington, US

Medicine
 National Service Center of the US National Cancer Institute
 National Skin Centre, a Singapore medical facility
 Neural stem cell
 Nursing Service Cross, an Australian Honours System medal

Banking and investment
 National Sort Code, an Irish bank code
 Nomura Securities Co, an investment bank
 National Savings Certificates (India), an Indian Government Savings Bond

Computing
 National Software Centre, an Irish organization
 National Supercomputer Centre in Sweden
 NetShow Channel, a streaming media system
 .nsc, the filename extension for NetShow Channel, now called Windows Media Station
 Network Systems Corporation, a computer product manufacturer
 NonStop Clusters, an SCO UnixWare add-on package

Other uses
 National Safety Council, an American nonprofit organization
 National Salvation Committee, a Ukrainian organization
 National Science Council, a government body in Taiwan renamed as Ministry of Science and Technology
 National Security Committee (Australia), peak decision-making body for national security in the Australian Government
 National Security Committee (Ireland), Irish interdepartmental committee on national security
 National security council, a government body found in many countries
 National Space Centre, a British tourist attraction
 National Space Council, a panel of government and military officials dedicated to the review and improvement of the United States' space programs.
 National Statistical Commission, an Indian organization
 National Supervisory Commission, a Chinese anti-corruption agency
 Necessary and sufficient condition, a concept in logic
 New Safe Confinement, the structure intended to contain the nuclear reactor at Chernobyl, Ukraine
 North-South Carrier, a Botswana water pipeline
 Norwegian Space Centre
 Newman & Spurr Consultancy, a UK company providing simulation and analysis-driven training